The Battle of Tonegawa was the last battle between Uesugi Kenshin and Takeda Shingen during the final years of the Sengoku period (16th century) of Japan .

During the year of 1571, the famed Uesugi Kenshin had advanced to the province of Kozuke and attacked the satellite castle of Takeda Shingen --Ishikura castle--. Shingen responded to Kenshin's attack, in which both forces met each other in a stand-off across the Tonegawa river. The opponents eventually disengaged each other after a well-fought battle.

References

Tonegawa
1571 in Japan
Tonegawa